The Battle at Jurjeve Stijene was fought on 16 October 1663 at a canyon near Otočac in the Habsburg Kingdom of Croatia between the forces of Petar Zrinski, at the time captain of Senj, Ogulin and Primorje, and the forces of the Ottoman Empire under Ali-Pasha Čengić of the Eyalet of Bosnia.

Background
Following his initial successes against the Ottomans, Petar Zrinski was appointed captain of Senj, Ogulin and Primorje in 1658. During the wars in Transylvania, the Ottoman commander Ali-pasha Čengić planned to conquer the town of Otočac, and then carry out an invasion of Carniola. The high commander of the military frontier, Herbert Auersperg, withdrew to Ljubljana during this occasion.

Battle
Being aware of considerable numerical superiority of the Ottoman army, Zrinski decided to launch an attack in a location most detrimental to such an advantage and chose the exit of a canyon near Jurjeve stijene (George's rock), which was near the town of Otočac. His plan was to surprise the Ottomans with 2,000 frontier soldiers and make it unable for them to turn to military formation utilizing approximately 8,000–10,000 soldiers. A thorough strategic preparation came to fruition, as the Ottoman army crossed the expected route at dawn on October 16 and were attacked at the exit from the canyon with all available means. Cavalry charged at them with sabres, which were additionally supported by infantry muskets. The Ottomans were surprised by the attack, causing panic and disarray, and about 1,500–2,000 were killed, with many hundreds captured, including the commander Ali-Pasha Čengić himself. Zrinski's army ended with only a few casualties.

Aftermath

The victory of the Christian army was overshadowed by later events, as the supreme commander of the military frontier, general Herbart Auersperg accused Zrinski of attacking the Ottomans without the previous agreement with him. Ultimately, Zrinski was forced to hand over all plunder and high ranking prisoners to him. The complete victory over the army from the Bosnian Eyalet marked the end of further Ottoman advance into Gacka, and prevented continuous future invasions from Bosnia into Croatian territory. The victory was celebrated abroad in Germany and Italy.

References

17th-century conflicts
Jurjeve Stijene
Jurjeve Stijene 1663
Jurjeve Stijene 1663
1663 in the Habsburg monarchy
Jurjeve Stijene